In May 2006, the North American Entertainment Software Rating Board (ESRB) changed the rating of The Elder Scrolls IV: Oblivion, a video game for PCs, the Xbox 360, and eventually (after the change took place) the PlayStation 3, from "Teen" (13+) to "Mature" (17+). The ESRB cited the presence of content not considered in their original review in the published edition of Oblivion. This included detailed depictions of blood and gore and sexually explicit content. The sexually explicit content was an art file, made accessible by a third-party modification called the Oblivion Topless Mod, that rendered the game with topless female characters.

In response to the new content, the ESRB conducted a new review of Oblivion, showing to its reviewers the content originally submitted by the game's publisher along with the newly disclosed content. The new review resulted in an M rating. The ESRB reported that Bethesda Softworks, the game's developer, would promptly notify all retailers of the change, issue stickers for retailers and distributors to affix on the product, display the new rating in all following product shipments and marketing, and create a downloadable patch rendering the topless skin inaccessible. Bethesda complied with the request, but issued a press release declaring their disagreement with the ESRB's rationale. Although certain retailers began to check for ID before selling Oblivion as a result of the change, and the change elicited criticism for the ESRB, the events passed by with little notice from the public at large. Other commentators remarked on the injustice of punishing a company for the actions of its clients, and one called the event a "pseudo-sequel" to the Hot Coffee minigame controversy.

Background

ESRB review process 
The ESRB's review process involves the submission, by the game's publisher, of a video which captures all "pertinent content" in the game, where pertinent content is defined as any content that accurately reflects both the "most extreme content of the final product" and "the final product as a whole". That is to say, it must depict the "relative frequency" of said content. As ESRB President Patricia Vance explains it, the ESRB would not just want a "tape of one extreme cut to another", but rather "context for the storyline, the missions, the features and functionality of a game, so that the raters really can get exposed to a pretty reasonable sense of what they'd experience playing the game". The fact that the content of Oblivion under investigation was inaccessible during normal play made no difference in the decision. ESRB policy had been "absolutely clear" since the Hot Coffee controversy, Patricia Vance told a reporter. Publishers were told that they could not leave unfinished or other pertinent content on a disc. If locked-out content was "pertinent to a rating", ESRB policy stated that it needed to be disclosed, and Bethesda had not done so.

Oblivion Topless Mod 
Released in March 2006 and reported on game news sites as a curiosity in April of the same year, the Oblivion Topless Mod had been created by a woman calling herself "Maeyanie". Maeyanie created the mod in protest against what she called "government/society/whatever forcing companies to 'protect our innocent population from seeing those evil dirty things 50% of them possess personally anyways'." The gaming website Joystiq reported on the mod on April 6, 2006: "Modders are already hard at work on bending the code of the recently released PC version of Elder Scrolls IV: Oblivion to their will. Early success: topless mod FTW!" Kotaku, another gaming site, reporting on the mod on April 5, 2006, did not consider the mod anything new and said, "As usual in the world of computer gaming, one of the first mods released for a popular game allows you to see the breasts of the main character." The content of the mod, wrote commentator Michael Zenke, Editor of Slashdot games, was fairly tame. Without nudity of the lower torso, and without self-consciousness on the part of the nude NPCs, Zenke wrote, the Oblivion Topless Mod was "as erotic as a doctor's visit". Pete Hines had discussed the mod with GameSpot staff before the game was re-rated, saying that he did not consider it a concern. "We can't control and don't condone the actions of anyone who alters the game so that it displays material that may be considered offensive. We haven't received any complaints on the issue from anyone."

ESRB re-review and rating change 
During these investigations ESRB staff also found more blood and gore than the review tape had portrayed:

In response to the new content, the ESRB hastily conducted a new review of Oblivion, showing to its reviewers the content originally submitted by Bethesda along with the newly disclosed content. The new review resulted in a Mature rating. The ESRB reported that Bethesda, to correct for the discrepancy, would promptly notify all retailers of the change, issue stickers for retailers and distributors to affix on the product, display the new rating in all following product shipments and marketing, and create a patch for download rendering the topless skin inaccessible. In line with its stated mission of informing consumers regarding the age-suitability of its marked games, the ESRB also released an ESRB Parent Advisory, ensuring that parents would be "immediately notified" of the change.

Industry impact

Retailer response 
Following news of the rating change on May 3, 2006, the Interactive Entertainment Merchants Association (IEMA), an organization of game retailers, which had previously eased the adoption of industry-wide ratings enforcement, issued its own statement, lauding its own retailers for the speed with which they reacted to the rating change. The IEMA release further stated that identification was needed to secure the purchase of Mature-rated games at roughly the same rate as was needed for R-rated film admission. In compliance with the ESRB's further demand that Bethesda request retailers "to adhere to their respective store policies not to sell the newly rated M (Mature) game to those under the age of 17", several retailers had begun to include cash register prompts tied to the game's bar code, instructing the cashier to ask for ID. A report by Gamasutra observed that some retailers—Circuit City specifically—were even pulling the game from their shelves entirely, "presumably until rating modifications can be made".

Publisher response 
Following the announcement of the rating change, Bethesda issued their own press release. Bethesda announced that it was their organization, not Take-Two Interactive, that had handled the ratings application, and that they stood behind it. Bethesda would not contest the change, and would promptly seek to implement the ESRB's demands, without demanding a product recall. Nonetheless, Bethesda stated that Oblivion was not typical of Mature rated titles, and did not contain "central themes of violence" common to such titles. The response asserted that Bethesda's submission to the ESRB was "full, accurate, and comprehensive", following the forms and requirements published by the ESRB, and that nothing was withheld. Bethesda stressed that there was no nudity in their game without a modification, that the company "didn't create a game with nudity" and did not intend for nudity to appear in their game. The press release concluded that "Bethesda can not control tampering with Oblivion by third parties".

Rating agency response outside the United States 
The British Board of Film Classification (BBFC), the ESRB's counterpart in the United Kingdom, did not change its rating of 15. A BBFC spokesperson told GamesIndustry.biz reporters on May 4, 2006: "Were it the case that the developer themselves had included and failed to disclose certain modifications of content, a recall may be required, but not as a result of a patch that has been placed on the Internet by a third party". Any modifications made after release fall outside the BBFC's powers under the Video Recordings Act 1984.

In July 2007, the Pan European Game Information (PEGI) announced that it was extending its purview to cover "games playable online via consoles, PCs and mobiles". Websites or online retail games participating in the program would be granted a PEGI Online logo, specifying whether "the particular game or site is under the control of an operator that cares about protecting young people". An article by gaming website Shacknews noted at the time that PEGI's initiative would address the concerns US publishers had with user-created mods for Grand Theft Auto: San Andreas and Oblivion: responsibility for such mods would be placed on the participating publishers.

Public impact 
The events passed by with little concern from either the public or gaming journalists in particular. Zenke attributed the draw in attention to bigger stories that came later in May. The news, for example, came just a week before E3 2006, the last E3 before the show changed from a grand spectacle to a reserved industry-only affair. The story did not pass completely unnoticed, as certain commentators issued statements regarding the issue in the days following the re-rating. On May 4, 2006, then-California Assemblyman Leland Yee used the rating change to criticize the ESRB. Yee, who had previously called on the ESRB to change their rating of Grand Theft Auto: San Andreas to AO (Adults Only 18+), chastised the ESRB for failing parents again, and demonstrating their inability to police themselves. Yee called the ESRB's rating system drastically flawed, and called for further legislation to assist parents and protect children.

Game designer John Romero, lead designer of Doom, posted a statement in his blog criticizing the modders responsible:
Now what's going to happen? You'll probably start seeing game data files becoming encrypted and the open door on assets getting slammed shut just to keep modders from financially screwing the company they should be helping. And the day a game company's file encryption is hacked to add porn and the case goes to the ESRB for review – that's when we'll see how well game companies are protected from these antics and what the courts will rule. Hopefully it'll be on the developer's side. When the ratings change came, Zenke saw political caution in the move, rather than an intelligent response to new content. Previous scandals had forced the Board's hand, and the ratings change was an act of self-preservation. Zenke, writing in June 2007 for online gaming magazine The Escapist, criticized the public for its failure to respond to the rating change, and emphasized what the change would mean to moddable games. At the core of Zenke's article was concern that a developer or publisher could be punished for content they neither produced nor distributed. Echoing Romero's concerns, Zenke saw the rating change as a threat, not only to modders, but to developers as well. Zenke asked what the ESRB would do in response to "Game 3.0" concepts, where community involvement is key. Referring to Sony's LittleBigPlanet, Zenke asked, "Will Sony provide personnel to review every fan-made level for offensive content? Will the ESRB?"

The Escapist, thinking the issues of a year past had died down, especially since they had not aroused much concern on first coming to light, did not expect the discord that ensued; response on their forums was heated, and the ESRB took "vigorous exception" to the piece. Zenke conducted a follow-up interview with ESRB President Patricia Vance, who clarified that the reason for the re-classification, aside from the previously undisclosed gore, centered around the fact that the texture for nude female breasts was created by Bethesda and already existed in the game's files, and was not created or added after the fact by the modder, similarly to the infamous "Hot Coffee" minigame from Grand Theft Auto: San Andreas. "In the case of Oblivion, the first thing we had heard about was the topless characters, where you can actually opt-in to play throughout the whole game with a topless character. That sounded like a mod to us, and we investigated, and we actually called Bethesda to determine if the art file being used in this mod was theirs, and they did confirm that it was. ... fully rendered. ... It wasn't a Barbie Doll image, it was fully rendered." In regard to what is considered by the ESRB for rating a game, Vance stated, "Our policies are quite clear: it's what's created by the publisher and included on the disc, not what's created or introduced by a mod. The mod may unlock it, the mod may make it accessible, but again, going back to the publisher's burden; putting the accountability on the publisher to fully account for the content that they create and they ship – that's all we care about." Vance went on to state that "ESRB can't rate content that is created by other players. We never have, we never tried, nor will we ever", and that the only warning ESRB issues regarding third-party content is "Game Experience May Change During Online Play".

References 

Entertainment Software Association
The Elder Scrolls
Obscenity controversies in video games
Video game controversies
Criticisms of software and websites